is a Japanese painter in the Nihonga style of watercolour painting.

Biography 
Uchida was born in 1949 in Tokyo. After that, she mainly conducted sougakai activities. From 1993 she served at the teaching school at Musashino art school, and won first prize at the 12th Yamatane museum prize exhibition. In 2002 she won the Kaii Higashiyama memorial nikkei nihonga grand prize. She has given personal exhibitions in many places.

Her compositions are characterized by a bold form and colours which are each independent.

Major works

Notes

External links
 Official website

1949 births
Japanese watercolourists
Living people
Nihonga painters
Artists from Tokyo